Olga Novikova is a Belarusian football striker, last played for Zorky Krasnogorsk in the Russian Championship. She has also played for FC Babruyshanka, Universitet Vitebsk (Belarusian League), Nadezhda Noginsk, ShVSM Izmailovo and Ryazan VDV.

She was a member of the Belarusian national team since 1995.

References

1977 births
Living people
Belarusian women's footballers
Expatriate women's footballers in Russia
Women's association football midfielders
Women's association football forwards
Belarus women's international footballers
Ryazan-VDV players
CSP Izmailovo players
FC Zorky Krasnogorsk (women) players
Bobruichanka Bobruisk players
Universitet Vitebsk players